José Retiz (born January 22, 1979, in Acapulco, Mexico) is a Mexican former professional footballer.

Retiz played collegiate soccer for Rancho Santiago Junior College in Santa Ana, California.  From 1998 to 1999, he scored 21 goals and 45 assists and played in 51 matches, helping Rancho Santiago to a 47-1-3 record in those two seasons.

He was originally drafted 29th overall by the Los Angeles Galaxy in the 2000 MLS SuperDraft but never joined the team.  He spent the 2001 and 2002 season with Mexican side Santos Laguna on their reserve team.  In 2001, he also played for the Southern California Seahorses of the USL PDL.  He returned to the Galaxy in 2003 as a non-roster invitee and appeared as a substitute in 5 games.  In 2004, he trained with Puebla F.C.  He returned to the MLS on March 21, 2006, when he signed with the Columbus Crew.

Retiz played 22 games in 2006 for the injury-ravaged Crew, before being released by the team in February 2007. He subsequently signed for the USL-1 expansion franchise California Victory.

Notes

1979 births
Club Puebla players
Living people
Mexican expatriate footballers
Mexican footballers
Footballers from Guerrero
Santos Laguna footballers
LA Galaxy players
Columbus Crew players
Sportspeople from Acapulco
California Victory players
Southern California Seahorses players
Expatriate soccer players in the United States
USL League Two players
Major League Soccer players
USL First Division players
LA Galaxy draft picks
Association football forwards